William Thomas Wood (10 June 1854 – 10 June 1943) was a Liberal Party Member of Parliament in New Zealand.

Early life and family
Born in Hobart, Tasmania, in June 1854, Wood was the son of Robert Wood and Charlotte Wood (née Watford). After leaving school he worked as a blacksmith for seven years, before moving to New Zealand in 1872. He lived first in Dunedin, working as a manager on the construction of the Port Chalmers–South railway. In 1875 he settled at Kumara on the West Coast, where he established a blacksmith's business. He married Ellen Jolly of Kumara in 1879, and the couple went on to have seven children. In March 1879, Wood moved to Palmerston North, setting up as a blacksmith there, and continuing in that business until it was taken over by his eldest son in 1900.

Political career

Local politics
Wood was active in local body politics. He was elected councillor on the Palmerston North Borough in 1884, 1885–1887, 1892–1895 and again in 1901. He was Mayor of Palmerston North from 1895 to 1899, and again from 1901 to 1903.

From 1902 to 1904 Wood was a member of the Wellington Harbour Board representing Manawatu.

Member of Parliament

Wood was endorsed by Prime Minister Richard Seddon as the government candidate for the Palmerston (now Palmerston North) electorate in the 1899 general election, a measure by which Seddon demonstrated his opposition to Frederick Pirani.

Wood won the Palmerston electorate in the 1902 general election, was re-elected in 1905, but in 1908 he was defeated by the Reform candidate David Buick.

He later retired to Australia and died in the Sydney suburb of Bondi on 10 June 1943, his 89th birthday. The funeral service was held at St Matthew's Anglican Church, and he was cremated at Northern Suburbs Crematorium.

Notes

References

New Zealand Liberal Party MPs
1854 births
1943 deaths
Mayors of Palmerston North
Unsuccessful candidates in the 1899 New Zealand general election
Unsuccessful candidates in the 1908 New Zealand general election
Palmerston North City Councillors
19th-century New Zealand politicians
Politicians from Hobart
Australian emigrants to New Zealand
New Zealand blacksmiths
Wellington Harbour Board members